Franco Benedetti (30 October 1932 – 11 November 2009) was a Greco-Roman wrestler from Italy. He competed at the 1952 and 1960 Olympics and finished in 5th and 12th place, respectively. He won a bronze medal at the 1953 World Wrestling Championships.

References

External links
 

1932 births
2009 deaths
Olympic wrestlers of Italy
Wrestlers at the 1952 Summer Olympics
Wrestlers at the 1960 Summer Olympics
Italian male sport wrestlers
World Wrestling Championships medalists
20th-century Italian people
21st-century Italian people